Mushfiqur Rahman (born 1980) is a Bangladeshi cricketer.

Mushfiqur Rahman may also refer to:
 Mushfiqur Rahman (politician), Bangladesh Nationalist Party politician and the former Member of Parliament of Brahmanbaria-4
 G. M. Mushfiqur Rahman (1966–1989), decorated Bangladeshi soldier

See also 
 Mushfiqur Rahim, Bangladeshi cricketer